Eldar Gasanov (born 26 September 1982) is a Ukrainian chess player who holds the FIDE title of Grandmaster (2007). Gasanov graduated from University of Kharkiv. He is working as one of the trainers of Chesskidz LLP.

Chess career

 2002 - Winner of Ukrainian championship under 20
 2004 - Winner of Grandmaster round-robin tournament in Tula, Russia
 2005 - Tied 1st place in Abkhazia Open
 2006 - Tied 2nd place in President Cup, Azerbaijan
 2007 - Tied 2nd place in Istanbul Open, Turkey
 2007 - Tied II-IV places in Ukrainian Championship
 2008 - Winner of the Czech Open 2008 in Pardubice, Czech Republic.
 2017 - Tied 1st place in 15th Festival Scacchistico Internazionale "Città di Amantea", Italy.
2018 - Tied for 1st place in Prague Summer Open A
2018 - Tied for 1st place in XXXVIII Festival Internazionale "Conca della Presolana", Italy Bratto

References

External links

1982 births
Living people
Ukrainian chess players
Chess grandmasters
National University of Kharkiv alumni